Manfred Mann Chapter Three is the debut album released in 1969 by Manfred Mann Chapter Three. It was one of the three first albums released on the Vertigo record label. The principal members of the group were Manfred Mann and Mike Hugg. Mann played the organ and acted as the group's musical arranger, whilst Hugg handled vocals, played piano and was the chief songwriter. The group was augmented by a five-piece brass section and several distinguished jazz soloists.

The core songs "Travelling Lady", "Snakeskin Garter", "Devil Woman", and "Time" define the album's sound: long, slow, doomy one chord riffs beneath sections of breathy vocals, powerful brass and free-form improvised solos. "Konekuf" is the same without the vocals, while "A Study in Inaccuracy" is simply freeform. "Sometimes", "One Way Glass", "Ain't It Sad" and "Where Am I Going" are shorter and more melodic, wistful songs centering on Hugg's electric piano, on which he turns in an able solo on "Mister, You're a Better Man Than I".

The title of the instrumental "Konekuf" was Manfred Mann's slightly obscured reaction to Enoch Powell's infamous Rivers of Blood speech about immigration. (Manfred had left his home of South Africa for several reasons, but the country's institutionalized racism was definitely among them.) The musical theme would later re-appear as the middle part of the title track on the third Earth Band album Messin'. Likewise, "One Way Glass" was re-recorded in a more rock-oriented version on the second Earth Band album Glorified Magnified. The song also appeared with a different title and lyric ("Broken-Glass Lives") on the soundtrack of the film Swedish Fly Girls, recorded in 1969 by Chapter Three (although the film wasn't released until 1972). Chapter Three's version of "One Way Glass" was sampled by The Prodigy in their song "Stand Up", and Manfred himself played keyboard over this recording and included the result on Lone Arranger. Another song with connections to other parts of Mann's history is "Travelling Lady"; this song had previously been recorded by Manfred Mann the group and released on the b-side of their final single "Ragamuffin Man", then simply called "A 'B' Side".

Track listing
Tracks written by Mike Hugg except noted

Side one
 "Travelling Lady" (Manfred Mann, Hugg) (Lead vocals: Mike Hugg) – 5:48
 "Snakeskin Garter" (Lead vocals: Mike Hugg) – 5:48
 "Konekuf" (Mann) (Lead vocals: Mike Hugg) – 5:47
 "Sometimes" – 2:37 (Lead vocals: Mike Hugg)
 "Devil Woman" – 5:24 (Lead vocals: Mike Hugg)

Side two
  "Time" – 7:25 (Lead vocals: Mike Hugg)
 "One-Way Glass" (Mann, Peter Thomas) (Lead vocals: Manfred Mann) – 3:33
 "Mr. You're a Better Man Than I" (Mike Hugg, Brian Hugg, Mann) (Lead vocals: Mike Hugg) – 5:10
 "Ain't It Sad" (Lead vocals: Mike Hugg)– 1:57
 "A Study in Inaccuracy" (Lead vocals: Mike Hugg) (Mann) – 4:05
 "Where Am I Going" (Lead vocals: Mike Hugg) – 2:36

Additional tracks (1999 CD re-issue)
  "Sometimes" (single mono version) – 2:22
 "Travelling Lady" (single mono version) (Mann, Hugg) – 5:20
 "Devil Woman" (single version) – 5:23
 "A Study in Inaccuracy" (alternative version) – 5:10

Personnel
Manfred Mann Chapter Three
 Manfred Mann – organ, police whistle, arranger, backing vocals, lead vocals on "One Way Glass"
 Mike Hugg – piano, lead vocals on all tracks except “One Way Glass”, arranger
 Bernie Living – alto saxophone, flute 
 Steve York – bass guitar, electric guitar, harp
 Craig Collinge – drums
Wind section
 Clive Stevens – tenor saxophone 
 Carl Griffiths – tenor saxophone 
 Dave Coxhill – baritone saxophone 
 Gerald Drewett – trombone 
 Sonny Corbett – trumpet
Guest musicians
 Brian John Hugg – acoustic guitar
 Harry Beckett – trumpet on "Time"
 Sue and Sunny – backing vocals on "Devil Woman"

Technical
 Dave Hadfield – producer, engineer
 Derek Wadsworth – brass arrangements
 Luke Weall – art direction, design
 Jack Levy – cover art

References

1969 debut albums
Vertigo Records albums
Polydor Records albums
Bronze Records albums
Manfred Mann Chapter Three albums